One World Everybody Eats (OWEE) was a nonprofit community kitchen and is a foundation based in Salt Lake City, Utah.  Its motto was "a hand up, not a hand out."  The community kitchen concept is a restaurant based on a gift economy, allowing patrons to "pay what they can" and serving all members of the community regardless of their ability to pay. The Cafe incorporated volunteer and common-effort aspects similar to those of a community garden. The organization's stated goal was to provide all who eat high quality, all natural, simple food and to ask patrons to give fairly in exchange so that all could partake.

Operation
The cafe served food according to a "no-menu, no prices" model. A pay-what-you-want model was used.

If customers could not afford to pay, they could volunteer at the cafe doing dishes, cooking, or working in the garden, and receive meal vouchers in exchange for the work they performed.  Patrons could also pay for a meal by donating supplies or organically grown produce to the cafe. A wish list was maintained in the cafe for those interested in donating specific supplies.
One World did not turn anyone away for inability to pay. All patrons were asked to give fairly in exchange for their meal, but ultimately relied on a gift economy.

Fare
The cafe served an organic, natural, and local cuisine that includes vegan, vegetarian and meat dishes. There was no standard menu, the fare changes daily based on the availability of local food (often donations from patrons) and the Chef's inspiration. Although there was no menu, One World Everybody Eats specialized in "home-style" dishes from around the world featuring staples such as bread, soup, salad, entree, organic coffees and teas, dessert, grains, quiche, and dal and rice.  The cafe purchased foodstuffs locally whenever possible.

History
The One World Cafe was founded by Denise Cerreta in 2003, and is one of the first pay-as-you-can cafes in the world.  The One World Everybody Eats Foundation grew out of the concept of the cafe, to promote the social goals the cafe epitomizes.

Many in the food-service industry were skeptical that a restaurant business model that did not include set food prices would actually work, but One World Everybody Eats maintained the model since its inception. Since then, OWEE has closed the original location and is now focused on helping people start their own community kitchens.

In 2006, the founders of the SAME Cafe ("So All May Eat") in Denver, Colorado used the One World Cafe model as a basis for their own community kitchen.

In 2008, the founders of One World Spokane opened using the OWEE model.

In 2009, One World founder, Denise Cerreta, stepped down from daily operation of the cafe, in order to focus on helping other communities open restaurants using the OWEE model.

In 2009, A Better World Cafe in Highland Park, New Jersey opened using the OWEE model.

In 2010, the OWEE Foundation began hosting a yearly summit in January for entrepreneurs with restaurants based on One World's model as well as those interested in starting one.

On October 19, 2011, The Jon Bon Jovi Soul Foundation  (formerly the Philadelphia Soul Charitable Foundation) opened the JBJ Soul Kitchen, a community restaurant where patrons pay what they can afford for their meal, either with money or by volunteering work.

In Nov 2011 One World Spokane closed.

In 2012, the original Salt Lake City location closed.

See also
Food Not Bombs
Freeganism
 List of bakery cafés
Pay what you can

References

External links
Official Website—One World Everybody Eats
So All May Eat (SAME)

2003 establishments in Utah
Bakeries of the United States
Bakery cafés
Buildings and structures in Salt Lake City
Restaurants established in 2003
Restaurants in Utah
Simple living